The following events occurred in May 1925:

May 1, 1925 (Friday)
Cyprus became a British crown colony. 
The Manifesto of the Anti-Fascist Intellectuals was published in Il Mondo.
Mausoleums in Al-Baqi', Saudi Arabia were destroyed by King Ibn Saud.
The All-China Federation of Trade Unions, the world's largest trade union organization with 134 million members, was founded in Guangzhou, Republic of China.
Barcelona Sporting Club was founded in Ecuador.
Born: Scott Carpenter, astronaut, in Boulder, Colorado (d. 2013); Anna May Hutchison, baseball player, in Louisville, Kentucky (d. 1998)

May 2, 1925 (Saturday)
It was announced that King Alexander of Yugoslavia had signed a decree to have his brother Prince George interned as mentally incompetent.
Kezar Stadium opened in San Francisco.
The Hull Kingston Rovers defeated the Swinton Lions, 9 to 5, to win the Northern Rugby Football League championship in England.
A general election was held in Bolivia. The Partido Republicano won all 70 seats in the Chamber of Deputies and Jose Cabino Villeneuva was elected president, but the National Congress later annulled the results.
A U.S. Navy seaplane set a new record by staying airborne for 28-and-a-half hours.
Born: Roscoe Lee Browne, actor and director, in Woodbury, New Jersey (d. 2007); Inga Gill, actress, in Stockholm, Sweden (d. 2000); John Neville, actor, in Willesden, London (d. 2011)
Died: Johann Palisa, 76, Austrian astronomer; Antun Branko Šimić, 26, Croatian poet (tuberculosis)

May 3, 1925 (Sunday)
The groundbreaking ceremony was held for the Washington, D.C. Jewish Community Center. President Calvin Coolidge addressed the event, stating, "The Jewish faith is predominantly the faith of liberty."
Born: Jean Séguy, French sociologist of religions (d. 2007)

May 4, 1925 (Monday)
The Geneva Arms Conference began in Switzerland, seeking an international arms limitation agreement.
Born: Maurice R. Greenberg, business executive, in Chicago, Illinois; Olive Osmond, matriarch of the Osmond singing family, in Samaria, Idaho (d. 2004)

May 5, 1925 (Tuesday)
In Tennessee, high school biology teacher John Scopes was charged with teaching evolution from a chapter in the textbook Civic Biology.
The General Election Law was passed in Japan.
Born: Charles Chaplin, Jr., actor, in Beverly Hills, California (d. 1968)

May 6, 1925 (Wednesday)
The Wilno school massacre occurred in Wilno, Poland when a pair of eighth-grade students attacked the board of examiners with bullets and grenades, killing several people as well as themselves.

May 7, 1925 (Thursday)
Macedonian revolutionary Mencha Karnicheva assassinated Bulgarian activist Todor Panitsa in the Vienna Burgtheater.
Pittsburgh Pirates shortstop Glenn Wright turned the rare unassisted triple play against the St. Louis Cardinals.
Died: William Hesketh Lever, 73, English industrialist, philanthropist and politician; Todor Panitsa, 48, Bulgarian activist; Doveton Sturdee, 65, British admiral

May 8, 1925 (Friday)
Tom Lee rescued 32 people from the M.E. Norman,  a sinking steamboat that capsized in the Mississippi River.
South Africa passed a bill making Afrikaans the official language of the Union.
Born: Ali Hassan Mwinyi, politician, in Kivure, Tanzania

May 9, 1925 (Saturday)
The Keats House, which once belonged to the Romantic poet John Keats, was opened to the public.
Born: Roy Pritchard, footballer, in Dawley, England (d. 1993)

May 10, 1925 (Sunday)
FC Barcelona beat Arenas Club, 2 to 0 in the 1925 Copa del Rey Final in Spain.
New Zealand Prime Minister William Massey died in office. He was succeeded by Francis Bell.
Born: Sugako Hashida, Japanese screenwriter, in Seoul (Keijyo), South Korea (former Japan territory until August 15)(d. 2021)
Died: William Massey, 69, 19th Prime Minister of New Zealand

May 11, 1925 (Monday)
The romantic comedy film Eve's Secret was released.
Born: Max Morlock, footballer, in Nuremberg, Germany (d. 1994)

May 12, 1925 (Tuesday)
Paul von Hindenburg was sworn in as president of Germany. His inaugural address emphasised the need to place unity and mutual progress ahead of political partisanship.
William Jennings Bryan agreed to participate in a trial of John Scopes on the side of the prosecution, ensuring great national interest.
Born: Yogi Berra, baseball player, in St. Louis, Missouri (d. 2015)
Died: Amy Lowell, 51, American poet;  Charles Mangin, 58, French general

May 13, 1925 (Wednesday)
Aloys Van de Vyvere became Prime Minister of Belgium.
The Gold Standard Act was passed in Britain, officially returning the country to the gold standard.

May 14, 1925 (Thursday)
The French captured Bibane Height in the Rif War.
The novel Mrs Dalloway by Virginia Woolf was published.
Born: Sophie Kurys, baseball player, in Flint, Michigan (d. 2013); Les Moss, baseball player, in Tulsa, Oklahoma (d. 2012); Patrice Munsel, soprano singer, in Spokane, Washington (d. 2016)
Died: H. Rider Haggard, 68, English novelist

May 15, 1925 (Friday)
U.S. president Calvin Coolidge ruled out prohibitionist Wayne Wheeler's plan to use the American navy to enforce the Volstead Act, believing the navy's purpose should only be for national defense and not police duty.
Editorials in the Japanese press decried American plans to strengthen the naval base at Pearl Harbor, as such plans either suggested fear of Japanese aggression towards America or American aggression towards Japan.
Al-Insaniyyah, the first Arabic communist newspaper, is founded.
Died: Nelson A. Miles, 85, American general

May 16, 1925 (Saturday)
Flying Ebony won the Kentucky Derby.
 The first modern performance of Claudio Monteverdi's opera Il ritorno d'Ulisse in patria occurred in Paris.
Born: Nílton Santos, footballer, in Rio de Janeiro, Brazil (d. 2013)

May 17, 1925 (Sunday)
Thérèse of Lisieux was canonized as a saint.
Some 15,000 people demonstrated in Bucharest against the Brătianu government.
The Richard Rodgers and Lorenz Hart revue The Garrick Gaieties opened on Broadway.

May 18, 1925 (Monday)
Alfonso XIII of Spain signed a decree ending martial law in Spain, which had been imposed in September 1923.

May 19, 1925 (Tuesday)
Casey Stengel played in his final major league baseball game. The Boston Braves released him one day later, ending his fourteen-season playing career.
Born: Malcolm X, minister and activist, in Omaha, Nebraska (d. 1965); Pol Pot, Khmer Rouge leader, in Prek Sbauv, Cambodia (d. 1998)

May 20, 1925 (Wednesday)
Gerardo Machado became president of Cuba.
The Murrumbidgee River flooded in Australia, killing eight.
Died: Elias M. Ammons, 64, 19th Governor of Colorado; Joseph Howard, 62 or 63, 1st Prime Minister of Malta

May 21, 1925 (Thursday)
In an expedition directed by explorer Roald Amundsen, two specially-equipped seaplanes (the N24 and N25) took off from Kings Bay (now Ny-Ålesund) in Svalbard, Norway in an attempt to be the first to fly to the North Pole.
Legal 4.4 beer went on sale in the Canadian province of Ontario, triggering an influx of visitors from bordering U.S. states.
Died: Hidesaburō Ueno, 53, Japanese agricultural scientist and guardian of Hachiko

May 22, 1925 (Friday)
Unsure of their position, experiencing engine trouble and with half their fuel used up, the crew of the N25 touched down on the ice 150 miles short of the North Pole. The N24 spotted their predicament and landed as well. The next twenty-four days would be spent trying to chisel a primitive runway to take off again.
Born: James King, tenor singer, in Dodge City, Kansas (d. 2005); Jean Tinguely, artist, in Fribourg, Switzerland (d. 1991)
Died: John French, 1st Earl of Ypres, 72, British field marshal

May 23, 1925 (Saturday)
A powerful earthquake struck Toyooka, Hyōgo, Japan.
Born: Joshua Lederberg, molecular biologist, recipient of the Nobel Prize in Physiology or Medicine, in Montclair, New Jersey (d. 2008)
Died: Sir Edward Hulton, 1st Baronet, 56, British newspaper proprietor and thoroughbred racehorse owner

May 24, 1925 (Sunday)
The Lens war monument by French sculptor Augustin Lesieux was inaugurated in Lens, Pas-de-Calais.
The Bulgarian football club FC Vihren Sandanski was founded.
Born: Mai Zetterling, actress and film director, in Västerås, Sweden (d. 1994)

May 25, 1925 (Monday)
High school teacher John Scopes was indicted by a grand jury for violating Tennessee's anti-evolution law.
Born: Jeanne Crain, actress, in Barstow, California (d. 2003); José María Gatica, boxer, in Villa Mercedes, San Luis, Argentina (d. 1963)

May 26, 1925 (Tuesday)
International plans were drawn up for possibly sending a rescue expedition towards the North Pole, as the Roald Amundsen plane expedition had not been heard from since its departure five days earlier.
Chicago mobster Angelo Genna was assassinated by the North Side Gang, crashing his car after a high-speed chase in which he was shot numerous times. He died in a hospital shortly afterwards.
The Mongolian Air Force was activated.
Born: Alec McCowen, actor, in Tunbridge Wells, England (d. 2017)
Died: Angelo Genna, 27, boss of Genna crime family

May 27, 1925 (Wednesday)
The Coal Glen mine disaster occurred in Coal Glen near Farmville, North Carolina. 53 miners died in the explosion.

May 28, 1925 (Thursday)
British Home Secretary William Joynson-Hicks announced that he had issued instructions that no "aliens known to be engage in subversive activities abroad" would be allowed into the United Kingdom to participate in next week's communist conference in Glasgow.
Born: Dietrich Fischer-Dieskau, baritone singer and conductor, in Berlin (d. 2012); and Pavel Stepan, pianist, in Brno, Czecheslovakia (d. 1998)

May 29, 1925 (Friday)
British aviator Alan Cobham set a new record for the longest nonstop flight in a light airplane, flying his de Havilland Moth from Croydon Aerodrome in London to Zürich, Switzerland. The flight consumed only twenty-five gallons of gasoline and six pints of oil.

May 30, 1925 (Saturday)
Protests were staged in Shanghai against unequal treaties. Shanghai Municipal Police opened fire and sparked an international outcry; the May Thirtieth Movement drew its name from this incident.
Los Angeles police announced they had foiled a plot to kidnap Hollywood film stars Mary Pickford, Pola Negri and Buster Keaton for ransom. Three arrests had been made.
Peter DePaolo won the 1925 Indianapolis 500, the first driver to complete the course in under five hours.
Gordon Coates became the 21st Prime Minister of New Zealand.

May 31, 1925 (Sunday)
Rogers Hornsby managed his first game for the St. Louis Cardinals. They beat the Cincinnati Reds 5 to 2.
Died: John Palm, 39, Curaçao-born composer (tuberculosis)

References

1925
1925-05
1925-05